Ang Wei Neng (born 1967) is a Singaporean politician and businessman. A member of the governing People's Action Party (PAP), he has been the Member of Parliament (MP) representing the Nanyang division of West Coast GRC since 2020 and previously the Jurong Central division of Jurong GRC between 2011 and 2020.

Education
Ang was educated at The Chinese High School and Hwa Chong Junior College before  graduating from the National University of Singapore with a Bachelor of Arts degree and a Bachelor of Social Sciences with honours degree under a scholarship conferred by the Public Service Commission (PSC). 

He subsequently went on to complete a Master of Business Administration degree at the Nanyang Technological University.

Career
Ang started his career in the Singapore Police Force and was Head of Operations and Training at the Ang Mo Kio Police Division. After that, he joined American International Group as a profit centre manager. Later he joined Bexcom as an assistant vice president before leaving to be a senior manager in Hiap Moh Corporation.

In 2004, Ang joined SBS Transit and held various positions in the organisation, including General Manager of District Operations, before rising to Head of Bus Operations and Senior Vice President. On 1 May 2017, he was appointed Chief Executive Officer of Taxi Business in ComfortDelGro and has been in that position until 2022. On 1 April 2022, he was appointed to run SMRT's taxi business.

Political career 
Ang made his political debut in the 2011 general election when he joined a five-member People's Action Party (PAP) team contesting in Jurong GRC. After the PAP team won with 66.96% of the vote against the National Solidarity Party, Ang became a Member of Parliament representing the Jurong Central ward of Jurong GRC. He retained his parliamentary seat in the 2015 general election after the five-member PAP team contesting in Jurong GRC won with 79.28% of the vote against SingFirst. During the 2020 general election, Ang switched to join the five-member PAP team contesting in West Coast GRC and they won with 51.68% of the vote against the Progress Singapore Party. Ang thus became a Member of Parliament representing the Nanyang ward of West Coast GRC.

In Parliament, Ang was a member of the Public Accounts Committee between 2015 and 2020, and has been a member of the Estimates Committee since 2011 before he became its chairman in 2020. He is a member of the Government Parliamentary Committees for Transport and Education, and the chairman of the Singapore-America Regional Parliamentary Group. He is the chairman of the Jurong Town Council and vice chairman of the South West Community Development Council.

During the debate at parliament on 1 March 2022, Ang suggest his idea to have a time stamp on Singapore's university degree and university graduates in Singapore will be required to attend upgrading courses once every five years. His suggestion later draws criticism by the locals, and some commented Ang's inability to distinguish between a university degree and job training. Ang later apologised for his remarks, he also made a post on Facebook claiming that his suggestion on having a time stamp on degree certificates was not meant to be a policy recommendation.

Personal life
Ang is a member of the management committee of Grace Orchard School, a school for students with special educational needs. In 2019, he was the chairman of the organising committee of the River Hongbao, an annual event held at Marina Bay during the Chinese New Year. He was also a former president of the Volleyball Association of Singapore.

See also
 List of current Singapore MPs

References

External links
 Ang Wei Neng on Parliament of Singapore
 

1967 births
Living people
National University of Singapore alumni
Singaporean Christians
Singaporean people of Teochew descent
People's Action Party politicians
Members of the Parliament of Singapore